Open Places is a 1917 American silent Western film directed by W. S. Van Dyke and starring Jack Gardner, Carl Stockdale and Ruth King.

Cast
 Jack Gardner as Constable Calhoun
 Carl Stockdale as Dan Clark
 Ruth King as Mollie Andrews

References

Bibliography
 Connelly, Robert B. The Silents: Silent Feature Films, 1910-36, Volume 40, Issue 2. December Press, 1998.

External links
 

1917 films
1917 Western (genre) films
1910s English-language films
American black-and-white films
Essanay Studios films
Films directed by W. S. Van Dyke
Silent American Western (genre) films
1910s American films